Thottal Poo Malarum is a 2007 Indian Tamil-language romance film written and directed by P. Vasu, starring his son Sakthi Vasu and Gowri Munjal, two newcomers. Rajkiran, Sukanya, Nassar, Vadivelu and Santhanam played supporting roles. The music was composed by Yuvan Shankar Raja. The film was released on 3 August 2007 and became an average grosser. The film's title is based on a song from Padagotti (1964).

Plot 
Ravi Thyagarajan (Sakthi Vasu), a happy-go-lucky youngster, falls instantly in love with Anjali (Gowri Munjal), his college mate. Anjali's mother Periya Naayagi (Sukanya), a rich and arrogant entrepreneur, tries to play spoilsport in their romance. She arranges for her daughter's wedding with the son of her brother and a dreaded but kindhearted gangster named Varadharaja Vandaiyar (Rajkiran) in Mumbai. Ravi goes to Mumbai. He hides his true identity and manages to gain an entry into Vandiyar's family. Having won their confidence, Ravi sets himself on a mission to marry Anjali.

Cast

Soundtrack 

For the music of the film, P. Vasu teamed up with composer Yuvan Shankar Raja for the first time. The soundtrack was released on 23 June 2007 by Rajinikanth and Kamal Haasan. It features 6 tracks. 'Kavignar' Vaali wrote the lyrics for all the songs, except for "Kadatharen Naan Unnai", whose lyrics were written by Snehan.

Indiaglitz described the album as "rocking" and a "delight for music-lovers". Particularly, the song "Arabu Naade" became immensely popular and became a chartbuster song.

Critical reception 
TSV Hari of Rediff.com described the film as "very ordinary fare," adding that "Sakthi certainly deserved better." M Bharat Kumar of News Today called it a "mediocre offering" with "predictable sequences," noting that "the son seems to have delivered the goods well, while the father has failed as a director." However, IndiaGlitz described it as a "feel-good youthful entertainer" with an "intelligent screenplay and pacy narration" that is "sure to appease film-buffs."

Legacy 
The dialogue "Varum Aanaa Varaadhu" spoken by Ennatha Kannaiya became popular.

References

External links 
 
 Thottal Poo Malarum songs at Raaga

2007 films
Indian romantic musical films
2000s Tamil-language films
2000s romantic musical films
Films directed by P. Vasu
Films scored by Yuvan Shankar Raja